The ACAZ C.2, Ateliers de Construction Aeronautique de Zeebruge, was a prototype Belgian biplane fighter aircraft built in the 1920s.

Design and development
Built entirely of Duralumin metal, it was an advanced design at the time of its first flight in 1926, but although evaluated by the Belgian Air Force, no orders were placed. Of conventional biplane construction, the C.2, registered as O-BAFX, later OO-AFX, incorporated one unique feature - all four of its wings were identical and interchangeable. The aircraft also included space for cameras, allowing it to be used for photo-reconnaissance.

Operational history
The C.2 was used in a failed aerial expedition by Edmond Thieffry, who with two companions (Joseph Lang and Philippe Quersin), attempted to fly it to Belgian Congo, departing Belgium on 9 March 1928, but only getting as far as Philippeville (Belgium).

The sole prototype was written off in a crash on 25 January 1933.

Specifications (ACAZ C.2)

References

External links
 

C.2
1920s Belgian fighter aircraft
1920s Belgian military reconnaissance aircraft
Single-engined tractor aircraft
Biplanes
Aircraft first flown in 1926